Hercules Against the Mongols is a 1963 Italian peplum film directed by Domenico Paolella.

Plot 
The heirs of Genghis Khan conquered the city of Tudela and took prisoner Bianca (José Greci), the daughter of the king. Hercules (Maciste (Mark Forest) in the original version of the film) is sent to the rescue.

Though Genghis Khan eventually sought peace with the West, his death in 1227 AD puts into power his three war-like sons: Sayan, Susdal, and Kin Khan. These sons quickly overrun the city of Tuleda and take prisoner Princess Bianca, though young Prince Alessio escapes. Hercules comes to the rescue of Bianca, winning her freedom in a tournament in exchange for becoming a slave himself. Forces from the West soon come to re-take Tuleda and Hercules — freed from his bonds — helps to dispatch Genghis Khan's three sons while again saving Bianca and reuniting her with her young brother.

 Cast 
 Mark Forest as Hercules/ Maciste
 Maria Grazia Spina as Ljuba
 Ken Clark as Sayan
 José Greci as Bianca
 Howard Ross as Susdal
 Nadir Moretti as Kin Khan
 Tullio Altamura as Osvaldo 
 Bianca Doria as Raja  
 Giuseppe Addobbati as The King

ReleaseHercules Against the Mongols'' was released in Italy on 29 November 1963.

References

Sources

External links
 
 Hercules Against the Mongols at Variety Distribution

1963 films
Films directed by Domenico Paolella
Films scored by Carlo Savina
Peplum films
1960s adventure films
Maciste films
Films set in the Mongol Empire
Sword and sandal films
1960s Italian films